The Burley Bowl was a postseason college football bowl game played from 1945 through 1956.  It was held each year on Thanksgiving Day in Johnson City, Tennessee, at the city's Memorial Stadium, which was demolished in July 2010. The game was part of an annual two-day tobacco festival, with the name of the bowl coming from Burley tobacco.  Like some other postseason match-ups of the era, such as the Grape Bowl, Glass Bowl, and Optimist Bowl, results are listed in NCAA records, but the games were not considered NCAA-sanctioned bowls.

The inaugural game was held on November 29, 1945. That day was the last (and fifth) Thursday of November, which was observed as Thanksgiving in Tennessee that year, despite President Truman proclaiming the holiday to be the fourth Thursday of the month.

Game results

Game records

Most appearances
Only teams with more than one appearance are listed.

Notes
 NCAA records list the date of the first Burley Bowl as "1-1-1946", which is inconsistent with contemporary newspaper reports.

See also
 List of college bowl games
 National Register of Historic Places listings in Washington County, Tennessee (Memorial Stadium)

References

Further reading
 
 

Defunct college football bowls